Lehrs is a surname of German origin. It may refer to the following people:

 Ernst Lehrs (1894–1979), German anthroposophist
 Karl Lehrs (1802–1878), German classicist
 Max Lehrs (1855–1938), German art historian
 Philipp Lehrs (1881–1956), German herpetologist

See also 
 Lehr (disambiguation)
 Lehrer